Malaysia participated at the 2015 Summer Universiade in Gwangju, South Korea.

Medal summary

Medal by sports

Medalists

References

 Country overview: Malaysia on the official website

2015 in Malaysian sport
Nations at the 2015 Summer Universiade
Malaysia at the Summer Universiade